Al-Butaymat (El Buteimât) was a Palestinian Arab village the Haifa Subdistrict, located  southeast of Haifa. It was depopulated during the 1947–48 Civil War in Mandatory Palestine on May 1, 1948, under the Battle of Mishmar HaEmek.

History
In 1882, the PEF's Survey of Western Palestine (SWP)  found "traces of ruins" here.

A Haifa man, named Mustafa al-Khalil acquired land in among other places, Al-Butaymat, in the late Ottoman era.

British Mandate era
In the 1922 census of Palestine conducted by the British Mandate authorities, ‘’Al Buteimat’’  had a population 137, all  Muslims, decreasing in  the 1931 census to  112 Muslims, in a total of  29 houses.

In the 1945 statistics the village had a population of 110 Muslims,  and they had 3,832  dunams of land  according to an official land and population survey.   Of this, 8 dunams were for plantations and irrigable land,  2,508 for cereals, while 4  dunams were built-up (urban) land.

In 1945 the kibbutz of Gal'ed was established on what was traditionally village land.

1948 and aftermath
Benny Morris gives May 1948 as depopulation date, and "Fear of being caught up in the fighting" as the cause, but with a question mark.

In 1992 the village site was described: "The site is fenced in, overgrown with grass and cactuses. There are no traces of houses except for adobe bricks scattered around the site. Most of the surrounding lands are used as grazing areas, but some of them are cultivated."

References

Bibliography

External links
Welcome To al-Butaymat
 al-Butaymat,  Zochrot 
Survey of Western Palestine, Map 8:  IAA, Wikimedia commons 
 al-Butaymat from the Khalil Sakakini Cultural Center

Arab villages depopulated prior to the 1948 Arab–Israeli War
District of Haifa